Joshua Rico Garcia (born January 10, 1994) is an American professional baseball pitcher in the Oakland Athletics organization. He has previously played in MLB for the Colorado Rockies, San Francisco Giants and Baltimore Orioles. He played college baseball for Hawaii Pacific University. He was drafted by the Rockies in the 30th round of the 2016 Major League Baseball draft, and made his MLB debut with them in 2019.

Career
Garcia attended the Saint Louis School in Honolulu, Hawaii. He attended Hawaii Pacific University and played college baseball for the Sharks, for whom he was 21-13 with a 3.10 ERA in 45 starts. He was drafted by the Colorado Rockies in the 30th round (890th overall) of the 2016 Major League Baseball draft.

Colorado Rockies
Garcia made his professional debut with the Boise Hawks, going 0–4 with a 6.37 ERA in  innings. He played 2017 with Boise and the Asheville Tourists, posting a 2–6 record and 3.39 ERA in 16 games (12 starts).

He split the 2018 season between the Lancaster JetHawks and Hartford Yard Goats, pitching to a 13–9 record and 2.96 ERA over 27 games (26 starts).  Garcia was an MILB.com Organization All Star, and both a mid-season and post-season California League All Star.

Garcia opened the 2019 season with Hartford before being promoted to the Albuquerque Isotopes on June 20.

On August 27, 2019, the Rockies selected Garcia's contract and promoted him to the major leagues. He made his debut that night versus the Boston Red Sox, allowing six runs in five innings pitched. He pitched a total of six innings for the Rockies in 2019.

San Francisco Giants
On November 5, 2019, Garcia was claimed off waivers by the San Francisco Giants. He was non-tendered on December 2, 2019, and became a free agent. Garcia later re-signed with the Giants on a minor league deal in the offseason. In 2020, Garcia registered a 5.40 ERA with 7 strikeouts in 10 innings of work. On December 2, Garcia was nontendered by the Giants. On December 3, Garcia re-signed with the Giants on a minor league contract. On March 24, 2021, it was announced that Garcia would require Tommy John surgery and miss the 2021 season as a result. On March 27, Garcia underwent the procedure. On November 7, Garcia elected free agency.

Baltimore Orioles
On November 10, 2021, Garcia signed a minor league contract with the Baltimore Orioles organization. He was assigned to the Triple-A Norfolk Tides to begin the year.

On June 13, 2022, Garcia was selected to the 40-man roster to replace Keegan Akin, who could not travel to Toronto for a series against the Blue Jays due to his vaccination status. In two games, he allowed one run on three hits with a strikeout in three innings pitched. He was removed from the 40-man roster and returned to Triple-A on June 17.

He had his contract selected on July 10, 2022. On September 11, Garcia was designated for assignment and was outrighted to Triple-A.

Oakland Athletics
On November 11, 2022, Garcia signed a minor league deal with the Oakland Athletics.

References

External links

Hawaii Pacific Sharks bio

1994 births
Living people
American sportspeople of Puerto Rican descent
Baseball players from Honolulu
Major League Baseball pitchers
Colorado Rockies players
San Francisco Giants players
Baltimore Orioles players
Hawaii Pacific Sharks baseball players
Boise Hawks players
Asheville Tourists players
Lancaster JetHawks players
Hartford Yard Goats players
Albuquerque Isotopes players
Norfolk Tides players